The marbled flounder, Pseudopleuronectes yokohamae, is a flatfish of the family Pleuronectidae. It is a demersal fish that lives on saltwater sand and mud bottoms. Its natural habitat is the temperate coastal waters of the northwestern Pacific, from southern Hokkaido, Japan, to the  Yellow Sea, Gulf of Bohai, East China Sea and Korean Peninsula.

Diet
The diet of the marbled flounder consists primarily of benthic organisms such as amphipods, polychaetes, shrimps, crabs and other benthos crustaceans.

References

Pleuronectidae
Fish of the Pacific Ocean
Fish described in 1877
Taxa named by Albert Günther